Deopalpus is a genus of flies in the family Tachinidae.

Species
D. beameri (Reinhard, 1934)
D. californiensis (Macquart, 1851)
D. conformis (Reinhard, 1934)
D. contiguus (Reinhard, 1934)
D. flavicornis (Reinhard, 1934)
D. geminatus (Reinhard, 1934)
D. hirsutus Townsend, 1908
D. miscelli (Coquillett, 1897)
D. parksi (Reinhard, 1934)
D. torosus (Reinhard, 1934)

References

Tachininae
Tachinidae genera
Taxa named by Francis Walker (entomologist)